Al-mustasfa min 'ilm al-usul or On Legal theory of Muslim Jurisprudence is a 12th-century treatise written by Abū Ḥāmid Muḥammad ibn Muḥammad al-Ghazali (Q.S) the leading legal theorist of his time. A highly celebrated work of al-Ghazali on Usul Al-Fiqh. It is ranked as one of the four great works in this subject. The other three including 1. Al-Qadi Abd al-Jabbar who authored al-Qadi's al-`Umad; 2. Abu al-Husayn al-Basri who authored al-Basri's al-Mu`tamad (commentary on al-`Umad); 3. Al-Juwayni who authored Al-Burhan.

Content 
While Ghazali was deeply involved in tasawwuf and kalam. Most of Ghazali's activity was in the field of Islamic law and jurisprudence. He completed this book towards the end of his life.

Ghazali's method to Usul al-fiqh, as proven in his final and greatest work on Law, al-Mustafa, is based on the assertion that, in essence, this science depends on the expertise of how to extract ahkam (rules) from the Sharia sources. ('As for the science of fiqh, it concerns itself particularly with the Shari'ah rules themselves which have been established in order to qualify the acts of the locus of obligation, man.') Accordingly, Ghazali views it as crucial that any discussion on Usul should focus on three essential elements: the ahkam; the Adilla (sources); and the means by which rules are extracted from these sources, which mainly includes the evaluation of the quality and merit of the extractor, specifically, the mujtahid.

Structure

The Sharia rules 
The Sharia rules were further categorized into following:
 The Essence of the Rules
 The Categories of the Rules
 The Constituents of the Rules

The Sources of the rules 
The Sources of the rules included:
 The First Principal Sources (Quran and The Book of Abrogation)
 The Second Principal Sources (Sunnah)
 The Third Principal Sources (Ijma)
 The Fourth Principal Sources (Rational Proof and Istishab)

Influence
Ibn Qudamah who authored the greatest Usul Al-Fiqh book in the Hanbali madhab entitled Rawdat al-Nazir was significantly influenced by Ghazali's work, Al-mustasfa.

See also
 The Condensed in Imam Shafi’i’s Jurisprudence

References 

Books by Al-Ghazali
Books about Islamic jurisprudence
12th-century books
Persian literature